The Big Man is a 1908 Russian short drama directed by Alexander Drankov.  It is a lost film.

Plot 
The film is a screen version of the play "The Big Man" performed by artists of the St. Petersburg People's House.

References

External links 
 

1908 films
1900s Russian-language films
Lost Russian films
Russian black-and-white films
Russian silent films
Films of the Russian Empire
Russian drama films
1908 drama films
1908 lost films
Lost drama films
Silent drama films